This list of female Academy Award winners and nominees for non-gendered categories details women who have won or been nominated for awards in non-gender specific categories.

Best Animated Feature

Best Cinematography

Best Costume Design

At least one woman has been nominated for Best Costume Design at every ceremony since the category's inception.

Best Director

Best Documentary Feature

Best Documentary Short Subject

Best Film Editing

Best International Feature Film

The Academy Award for Best International Feature Film is awarded to countries, not individuals. This list contains female directors of nominated films, who typically accept the award on behalf of their country.

Best Makeup and Hairstyling

Best Original Score

Best Original Song

Best Picture

Best Production Design

Best Short Film (Animated)

Best Short Film (Live Action)

Best Sound Editing

Best Sound

Best Visual Effects

Best Writing (Adapted Screenplay)

Best Writing (Original Screenplay)

Special awards

Notes

References

General
 

Specific

Female
Academy Awards
Academy Awards
Academy Awards
Academy Awards
Academy Awards
Academy Award